The 2019–20 season was Barnsley's first season back in the EFL Championship since 2017–18. Aside of the Championship, they participated in the FA Cup and the EFL Cup. The season covered the period from 1 July 2019 to 20 July 2020.

Squad

Appearances and goals correct as of 22 July 2020.

Statistics

Appearances & goals

|-
!colspan=14|Players out on loan:

|-
!colspan=14|Players who left the club:

|}

Disciplinary record

Pre-season
The Reds have announced pre-season friendlies against Stalybridge Celtic, Toulon, VfL Bochum, Arminia Bielefeld and Sheffield United.

Competitions

Championship

League table

Result summary

Results by matchday

Matches
On Thursday, 20 June 2019, the EFL Championship fixtures were revealed.

FA Cup

The third round draw was made live on BBC Two from Etihad Stadium, Micah Richards and Tony Adams conducted the draw. The fourth round draw was made by Alex Scott and David O'Leary on Monday, 6 January.

EFL Cup

The first round draw was made on 20 June.

Transfers

Transfers in

Loans in

Loans out

Transfers out

References

Barnsley F.C. seasons
Barnsley